The 1999 season was the Detroit Lions' 70th in the National Football League (NFL). They finished the season with an 8–8 record, an improvement on their 5–11 record from the previous season, and qualified for the playoffs as the third-placed team in the NFC Central. It was their sixth playoff appearance of the decade, capping one of the most successful 10-year stretches in franchise history.

In 2004, Football Outsiders Mike Tanier named the 1999 Lions as one of the "worst playoff teams ever".

The Lions had just lost Barry Sanders to an abrupt retirement and started the season with second-year pro Charlie Batch at quarterback before he was lost to an injury and replaced by Gus Frerotte.

The team won six of their first eight games, including a victory over the eventual Super Bowl champion St. Louis Rams, which made the Lions a surprise contender at the midway point of the season; however, they managed only two more wins in the second half of the season and lost their final four games.

Offseason

NFL Draft 

Notes
 Detroit traded up from its second-round selection (39th) with Miami, receiving Miami's first-round selection (27th), which they had received from San Francisco, in return for Detroit's third- and fifth-round selections (70th and 142nd).
 Detroit traded up from a third-round selection (72nd) received from Baltimore as part of the trade of QB Scott Mitchell with Miami to the 70th pick, giving up a seventh-round selection (232nd) in return. Detroit had received the 232nd pick from Green Bay in exchange for RB Glyn Milburn.
 Detroit traded its fourth-round selection in 2000 to Philadelphia in exchange for the Eagles' fifth-round selection (137th).

Personnel

Staff

Roster

Regular season 

The season had an inauspicious beginning as future Hall of Fame running back Barry Sanders suddenly retired on the eve of training camp. Undaunted, coach Bobby Ross led the Lions to a fast start, highlighted by a Week 9 win over the then 6–1 St. Louis Rams.

The following week, Ross made a questionable decision to go for a failed two-point conversion after a touchdown against Arizona. The game ended with Detroit trailing by four points in the red zone trying to score a game-winning touchdown. The Lions would lose at Green Bay the following week, but defeat Chicago at home to get back on track.

The following week, the Lions picked up the franchise's first win vs. Washington since 1965, putting the team at an 8–4 and in sole possession of the second seed in the NFC. However, the Lions collapsed down the stretch and lost their last four regular season games to finish 8–8.

Two other NFC teams—the Packers and Carolina Panthers—finished 8–8, but the Lions beat the Panthers 24–9 in Week 7 and they held the conference record tiebreaker over the Packers, thus allowing Detroit to make the playoffs as the sixth seed despite losing their final four games.

This would be the Lions' last playoff appearance until the 2011 season.

Schedule

Standings

Postseason

Schedule

Game summaries

NFC Wild Card Game: at (#3) Washington Redskins

References

External links 
 1999 Detroit Lions at Pro-Football-Reference.com

Detroit Lions seasons
Detroit Lions
Detroit Lions